The 2008 CON-CAN Movie Festival is the 5th online short movie festival hosted by Media Research, Inc. The movie festival began on May 1, 2008 with the 20 movies selected for Group A being uploaded to the website, and is scheduled to conclude in mid-November with an award ceremony in Tokyo, Japan.

Info

The 5th CON-CAN Movie Festival had a total submission of approximately 550 movies from 50 countries. Since May 1, the CON-CAN Movie Festival has been presenting 20 selected movies a month on its website where viewers can watch for free and vote for the Audience Award. In November 2008, the CON-CAN Movie Festival will hold its 5th annual award ceremony, where it will showcase the Grand Prix and Tamashii award winners.

Selection Process

Once the April 21st submission deadline passed, the process of selecting the movies for the movie festival began. The programming department at CON-CAN is responsible for sorting through the movies. The best 80 movies out of all the submitted movies were selected to be part of the movie festival and their directors were notified via email.

The movie festival then branches off into two parts. For the first part, the 80 movies are categorized into four groups. Each group is independently displayed on CON-CAN's website between the months of May and August. During this time, registered voters are able to rate the movies and comment on them. The movie with the highest rating in each category is awarded an Audience Award along with a $500 cash prize.

For the second part, the same 80 movies are passed through a first round evaluation and judged by a domestic (Japanese) jury. These preliminary jury members select the best 20 movies to be considered for the final evaluation process. In the second round evaluation, international jury members selected by the CON-CAN staff select the top three nominations to be awarded the Grand Prix award (best short movie) ($10,000 cash prize) and the two Tamashii awards (special jury awards) ($2,000 cash prize each).

The winner of the Grand Prix award and the two Tamashii award winners are invited to Tokyo with travel and accommodations paid for in order to attend the award ceremony. The award ceremony hosts famous people from the movie industry and notable news networks.

Jury

The international jury which chooses the three best movies during the final evaluation round features famous people from the movie industry. Below is the jury from this year.

Jukka-Pekka Laakso (Chairman, Tampere Film Festival)
Kitaroh Kanematsu (Chairman, Japanese Society of Cinematographers)
Michael Renov (Associate Dean, USC School of Cinematic Arts)

Short Movie Selections

The movies below have been selected for the 2008 CON-CAN Movie Festival (listed in alphabetical order). All short movies and animations are able to be viewed for free without registering, however, only registered members (registration is free) are able to vote and comment on the movies within the time frame provided.

Group A

The following movies were selected for Group A of the CON-CAN Movie Festival. Registered members were able to vote and comment on Group A short movies from May 1–31, 2008 for the Audience Award.
Afrique!
Bahar
Cold Noodles Are Unpalatable
Crazy Clay Wrestling
Don't Let It All Unravel
Feast
The Girl In Red Sarong
Golden Hat
The Intruder
John and Karen
Just Call Me Tobi B.
My Dear Enemy
The Opportunist
Piano Piano
Sailors, Dogs
Save The World
To Live Is A Masterpiece
Tolerance
Under Construction
Walk With Her

Group B

The following movies were selected for Group B of the CON-CAN Movie Festival. Registered members were able to vote and comment on Group B short movies from June 1–30, 2008 for the Audience Award.
Ata
Bendito Machine I
Central Dogma
Death By Scrabble
Double Talk
Everyone and No One
Holding The Hand Of The Red Queen
I Don't Feel Like Dancing
Into The Morning
Keith Reynolds Can't Make It Tonight
Kel Bo Guan: Dept. of Life Science & Medical System
Mr. Kim's Burning Night
Rebirthday
Shawls and Moustaches
Something Like That
The Step
Terminus
The Tiny Fish
True Colors
When I Become Silent

Group C

The following movies were selected for Group C of the CON-CAN Movie Festival. Registered members were able to vote and comment on Group B short movies from July 1–31, 2008 for the Audience Award.
All Too Human
Break Time
Bronze Statues * Love
Chain Gestures (Gestos Em Cadeia)
Crossroad
Dear Beloved
Ersatze
Eve's Fruit Or Quite Fast Evolution
Fish'n Pills
Forever And Always (Evig Og Altid)
Humoresque
Marwa
On Earth As It Is In Heaven
On Seeing the 100% Perfect Girl One Beautiful April Morning
The Smallest Cinema Of the Universe
The Smiling Dog
Strike2
Swimming Moon
The Trip
WOFL 2106

Group D

The movies selected for Group D of the CON-CAN Movie Festival will be announced on August 1. Registered members are able to vote and comment on Group A short movies from August 1–31, 2008 for the Audience Award.
Akira's Hip Hop Shop
Baano
The Child Sorcerers of Kinshasa
Duck & Goose
El Vestido
Hard Cold Greenhouse
Hero, Wings Are Necessary To Fly
The Highway M8
Fortress Visitors
Kuchibeni
La Parabolica
The Life Size Zoetrope
Little Snaps of Horror
Los Gigantes, Alcibiades y el Bosque
Play
Please Insert Coin
Red-Light District Graffiti
Safety Zone
Stray Passenger
The Sweaty Backs On A Cracking Land

References

External links 
The 5th CON-CAN Movie Festival Official Website

Internet film festivals
Short film festivals